Double Cross Vodka is a brand of distilled spirit  produced in the Slovak Republic.  The distillery that produces Double Cross is situated in the town of Stará Ľubovňa, which is located in the Tatra Mountains in northeastern Slovakia.

Double Cross founders Malcolm Lloyd and John Gellner saw that there were few, if any, luxury goods from Slovakia in the U.S. They also noted that there were few vodka brands in the price range set for Double Cross; however there are many vodkas in the market. They put four years of research and development into their liquor, touring distilleries throughout Eastern Europe to find Jan Krak, a master distiller in Slovakia near the Polish border. The Slovak end of the business was developed by Eduard Heger, who is now prime minister, and Juraj Droba, who is now governor of the Bratislava region. 

Bottle Design 
The custom bottle design was created by designers Brian Adducci and Dan Baggenstoss of the Minneapolis design firm CAPSULE. It is uniquely flat and rectangular, unlike virtually any spirit container on the market, made from high-end French crystal, laser engraved custom calligraphy with 18th-century Slovakian poetry on the back and the Double Cross logo on the front, and topped with a heavy polished metal snap-on cap. The Double Cross name acknowledged the brand's heritage from the cross found in the Slovak flag and coat of arms.

Accolades 
Both the vodka and the unique bottle design have earned a variety of awards and attention in the consumer and business press.
 
In 2008, Double Cross won a gold medal for taste and a gold medal for package design at the San Francisco World Spirits Competition.

Wine Enthusiast gave Double Cross a rare 95-point "Highly Recommended" review and also included Double Cross in it selection of "Top 50 Spirits from 2009
F. Paul Pacult, in his industry publication Spirit Journal, gave Double Cross a 4-star/”Highly Recommended” review.
while Anthony Dias Blue gave Double Cross an “Outstanding” review in the Tasting Panel Magazine.

Playboy magazine said "rare that we single out a vodka for praise, but we'll make an exception for Double Cross."

News 
Dr. Malcolm Lloyd, the 42-year-old CEO of Old Nassau Imports and Double Cross Vodka, died in a car crash in Miami Beach on Thursday, April 24, 2014.

References

External links 
 

Slovak vodkas
Slovak brands